"Give Me Danger" is a song by American electropop duo Dangerous Muse. It was written by Mike Furey, Tom Napack, and produced by Ted Ottaviano for the duo's second EP of the same name. It was released in 2006 as a single, reaching number 11 on the Billboard Hot Dance Club Play chart.

Formats and track listings
Single release (Released July 10, 2007)
 "Give Me Danger" (Original Version) – 4:01
 "Give Me Danger" (Michael Skype/Ssigler Mix) – 4:05
 "Give Me Danger" (Mark Saunders Mix) – 7:30
 "Give Me Danger" (Blazing Lazer Remix) – 5:25
 "Give Me Danger" (Peter Rauhofer Club Mix) – 10:02
 "Give Me Danger" (Goddollars Rufftouch Mix) – 5:55
 "Give Me Danger" (Vanity Police Mix) – 5:16
 "Give Me Danger" (Silverspirit Clandestine Mix) – 8:20
 "Give Me Danger" (Rauhofer Reconstruction Dub) – 7:30

Digital download (Released July 17, 2007)
 "Give Me Danger" (Michael Skype / Ssigler Mix) – 4:05
 "Give Me Danger" (Mark Saunders Mix) – 7:29
 "Give Me Danger" (BlazingLazer Remix) – 5:25
 "Give Me Danger" (Peter Rauhofer Club Mix) – 10:01
 "Give Me Danger" (Goddollars Rufftouch Mix) – 5:54
 "Give Me Danger" (Vanity Police Mix) – 5:17
 "Give Me Danger" (Silverspirit Clandestine Mix) – 8:20
 "Give Me Danger" (Rauhofer Reconstruction Dub) – 7:29

SilverSpirit Guilty Conscience Remix UK Single (Released September 25, 2007)
 "Give Me Danger" (SilverSpirit Guilty Conscience Remix) – 6:55

References

External links
 The official Dangerous Muse site
 Dangerouse Muse's MySpace site

2006 singles
2006 songs